Bromelia hieronymi is a species of plant in the family Bromeliaceae native to South America. It is one of several plants used by the Wichí people as a fiber for weaving called chaguar.

hieronymi